= Journal de Bâle et Genève =

Swiss online French-language journal

- Format: On-line
- Publisher: Trinational Media
- Founded: 2009
- Language: French
- Headquarters: Geneva, Switzerland
- ISSN: 2624-8565
- Website: journaldebale.ch

Journal de Bâle et Genève is an independent Swiss online journal published by the agency Trinational Media - formerly Bâle.ch - founded in Basel in 2009: It takes the name from the cities of Basel and Geneva.

The media covers current affairs in two cross-border urban areas: the trinational metropolitan area of Basel, spanning Switzerland, France (South Alsace), and Germany and the Greater Geneva, franco-swiss conurbation encompassing the Canton of Geneva, the city of Nyon (Canton of Vaud) and neighboring French departments (Haute-Savoie and Ain), focusing in particular on urban transformation, mobility, ecology, and culture.
